The Puffing Billy Railway is a  narrow gauge heritage railway in the southern foothills of the Dandenong Ranges in Melbourne, Australia. The railway was one of the five narrow gauge lines of the Victorian Railways which opened around the beginning of the 20th century. It is close to the city of Melbourne and is one of the most popular steam heritage railways in the world, attracting tourists from Australia and overseas. The railway aims to preserve and restore the line as near as possible to how it was in the first three decades of its existence, but with particular emphasis on the early 1920s.

The primary starting point is Belgrave station which houses the railway's operations and administration centre. The line runs through Lakeside Station where a visitor information centre provides catering and an indoor interpretive space. The south-eastern terminus is Gembrook railway station. In 2022 the railway also returned the traditional Puffing Billy Railway dangling of legs from the train carriages which is a core part of the charm of the railway.

History

The original line was opened in 1900 to serve the local farming and timber community. It ran from Upper Ferntree Gully station, the terminus of the broad gauge line from Melbourne. The section of the line from Upper Ferntree Gully to Belgrave is operated by Metro Trains Melbourne suburban electric trains, which was rebuilt to  gauge between 1958 and 1962.

The railway had attracted a number of colloquial names locally before Puffing Billy became the dominant one. Services stopped in 1953 after a landslide blocked the line between Selby and Menzies Creek, and it was formally closed in 1954. At the end of 1954, the Victorian Railways sought to minimise their financial risks if the railway was to reopen. Harold L. Hewett, a teacher at Melbourne Grammar School, organised a rally attended by 400 people at Upper Ferntree Gully station on 4 January 1955 to try to save the railway.

Preservation 
Following closure, a few farewell specials operated on the remaining usable section to Belgrave, and these proved very popular. On 1 October 1955, the Puffing Billy Preservation Society was formed to keep the railway running indefinitely. They operated trains to Belgrave until 1958 when services again ceased for conversion to a broad-gauge, electrified suburban line. The society started work on restoring the Belgrave to Lakeside section. Rover Scouts attending the 7th World Rover Moot held at Wonga Park assisted in the clearing of the line between Belgrave and Menzies Creek as part of the event's community service component. On 28 July 1962 trains resumed running between Belgrave and Menzies Creek.

Operations were extended over the remainder of the original line, opening to Emerald on 31 July 1965 and Lakeside on 18 October 1975 before reaching Gembrook, which was opened on 18 October 1998. The first trains to Gembrook carried children from the primary schools along the Belgrave–Gembrook corridor, two of which directly adjoin the railway and the remainder not more than a street away. 

The railway operates daily (except for Christmas day) between Belgrave and Lakeside, with services to Gembrook on Sundays. Its infrastructure is restored and recreated to reflect the heyday of the line between 1900 and 1930, and is operated with some of the railway practices from the Victorian Railways of that era, such as using the "Staff and Ticket" safeworking system. In the 2016/17 financial year, Puffing Billy carried 487,237 passengers, up more than 60,000 from the previous financial year.

Structure

When the Puffing Billy Preservation Society was formed in 1955, the line was still under the control and ownership of the Victorian Railways (V.R.). The society arranged for the V.R. to run the train on weekends and holidays, with the Society guaranteeing the V.R. against losses from insufficient ticket sales.  Society volunteers took the role of conductors, checking tickets on the train, and fund-raising. This arrangement continued until the Upper Ferntree Gully to Belgrave section was closed in 1958.

When the line reopened in 1962 (between Belgrave and Menzies Creek), society volunteers took a larger role, manning stations, selling and checking tickets, and doing non-safety-critical maintenance on the train, and track maintenance under the supervision of a V.R. ganger. Ticket revenue went into an account on which the V.R. drew to pay for their staff involved in running the line.

The Victorian Railways were not in the preservation or tourism business, and the arrangement was less than ideal, so the Victorian Government passed the Emerald Tourist Railway Act 1977 (No. 9020) to set up the Emerald Tourist Railway Board as a statutory authority to take over ownership and operation of the railway from the V.R. from 1 October 1977. The act required that the Board have between five and ten members, four of which were to be nominated by the Puffing Billy Preservation Society. 

With the ETRB defined as the operators of the Railway, the Puffing Billy Preservation Society providing the volunteer support. 

In recent years, all volunteers that work on the railway have been directly engaged by the ETRB and are required to register and complete a range of induction processes. The railway still relies heavily on the volunteers that welcome guests from all parts of the world and are highly trained to supply the safe and successful operations of Puffing Billy Railway.

There are many roles required to operate a heritage steam railway in a modern compliance world. These include signalmen, guards, firemen, engine cleaners, drivers, track patrollers, fire patrollers, safeworkers, Station-masters, conductors, booking clerks, refreshment staff, gardeners, maintenance workers, researchers, and administration. Staff also operate across management, finance, HR, OH&S, Child Safety, workshops, way and works, and operational staff to support the volunteer roles. 

In 2022, the Emerald Tourist Railway Act 1977 was replaced by a new Act called the Puffing Billy Railway Act 2022. This act was partly influenced by the recommendations of the 2018 Ombudsman Report into the activities of Robert Whitehead at Puffing Billy Railway and other heritage railway groups around Victoria. The new Act modernised the governance of the railway and in particular the selection of Board members and reporting to the relevant minister.  

Volunteers remain at the core of the operation of the railway and the new Act continues the need for volunteers to be registered with the Board. The Preservation Society does not have direct management or involvement in the operation of the railway.

Operation

Belgrave houses the main offices of the railway, the locomotive running shed and locomotive workshops; it is the base for track maintenance operations. Other offices are located at Emerald). Trains from Belgrave generally travel to Lakeside. The railway operates every day of the year except Christmas Day.

A popular feature of a ride on Puffing Billy was sitting on the ledge of the open-sided carriages. After a crash between a train and a minibus at the Menzies Creek level crossing on 5 March 2018, this practice was suspended. The suspension was permanently lifted on 4 February 2022.

There is a narrow-gauge railway museum at Menzies Creek station, which reopened in March 2022 after re-development. It is open on Friday, Saturday and Sunday.

Scandal
In 2014, Robert Whitehead, a long-serving volunteer on the railway, was convicted of multiple sexual offences against young boys. He died in prison in 2015, while serving a sentence of more than 8 years. Whitehead had been convicted and jailed in 1959 of molesting a Boy Scout, but returned to his job on the railways at the request of Murray Porter, a state government minister. He joined the Puffing Billy Railway as a volunteer in 1961 and rose to become Secretary of the Puffing Billy Preservation Society. He used his position to meet and molest boys into the 1990s. In 2018, the ombudsman's report on the case found that the board of the railway had known about Whitehead's activities and had actively protected him. Significant changes have occurred at the railway since the Ombudsman Report that includes implementing the recommendations and supporting an open and transparent complaints and feedback process. In 2022 a new Victorian Parliament Act was passed that replaced the Emerald Tourist Railway Board with the Puffing Billy Railway Board. The Act modernised the governance of the railway which was noted by the Ombudsman to have failed.

Locomotives and rolling stock

Locomotives
The railway owns all the surviving Victorian Railways narrow-gauge locomotives and has restored all but one to operating condition, although not all are running at any one time. This includes  NA class locomotives 3A (unrestored), 6A, 7A, 8A, 12A and 14A, and G class Garratt locomotive G42.

In December 2019 NG G16 Garratt locomotive 129 imported from South Africa entered service. It had been purchased in 1996, and was rebuilt and re-gauged for the Puffing Billy. It complements the operational capabilities of G42. The NA class locomotives are limited to pulling a maximum of 10 carriages, while the Garratts can haul up to 16.

The railway has a number of smaller steam locomotives at museum at Menzies Creek, either on static display or in operating condition. They occasionally operate special trains and at events such as Thomas the Tank Engine days.

Puffing Billy Railway also offers driver experience days on the smaller steam engines. The Climax engine has been restored for this purpose as it has a large driving cab and is unique in Australia.

The railway operates three diesel locomotives which are used on days of total fire ban, plant or works trains, or when too few steam locomotives are available, including in emergencies. D21 is former Tasmanian Government Railways V class V12, while DH5 and DH59 are ex Queensland Railways DH class DH5 and DH59. All were regauged and rebuilt for the railway. Diesel Rail Tractor (NRT 1) is mainly used for shunting rolling stock at the carriage workshops.

VR Original

Other steam

Carriages
The mainstay of the carriage fleet are the 15 NBH open-sided carriages built specially for tourist traffic on the Gembrook line by the V.R. between 1918 and 1919, and a further 10 vehicles built to the same or similar design in the preservation era. However, there are also a number of enclosed carriages, both saloon and compartment cars. In addition, four carriages were obtained from the Mount Lyell Railway in Tasmania after its closure in 1963, and regauged and reclassified for Puffing Billy use, numbered 1–4NAL. They are named Mt Lyell, Double Barril, Rinadeena and Teepookana to reflect their Tasmanian heritage. These vehicles are now used as first-class carriages and used primarily on the Luncheon train and Dinner train.

Several carriages have been temporarily converted to include a guard's compartment. A number of NQR low-sided goods trucks have also been modified for passenger use, making them similar to the NBH carriages.  Another three NQR trucks have been fitted with seats but no roof and are only used during the summer peak season.

Goods vehicles and brake vans
Representatives of all classes of goods vehicles and brake vans (including combined brake van and passenger carriage) used on the narrow gauge lines of the Victorian Railways are to be found on the Puffing Billy line, and are used for works trains, storage, and occasional heritage trains recreating the look of trains in the 1920s.

In popular culture
Solo One was a TV police drama series produced by Crawford Productions that screened in 1976, filmed and set in Emerald, Victoria, about a local (fictional) policeman dealing with crime in the town, however it was aimed at a younger audience than most Australian TV police dramas. It featured Puffing Billy in the opening credits scene as well as being part of most story-lines.

The ABC children's drama Come Midnight Monday was filmed in and around Belgrave, Emerald & Cockatoo and featuring Puffing Billy locomotive 12A—renamed "Wombat"—as the main character.

Filming of A Country Practice in the fictional town of Wandin Valley (the towns of Wandin, Wandin North and Wandin East are however 30 km north of Emerald) was moved to Emerald when the show moved to Network 10, and occasionally featured Puffing Billy.

The 1966 television special The Seekers at Home filmed a segment at Puffing Billy, where The Seekers sing "Morningtown Ride" to a group of children.

Filming of Round the Twist was in and around Belgrave to Lakeside.

In 1997, the soap opera Neighbours filmed scenes set on and around the train. The characters of Darren Stark and Libby Kennedy lost young Louise Carpenter and chased after the train en route to Belgrave on a motorbike to catch up with her after discovering she had boarded it.

Line guide

Regular Puffing Billy services usually only stop at stations shown in bold print at the right. Stops at other stations can be made by request. Distances are from Southern Cross station.

Bibliography 
 Speed Limit 20— history of Victorian Government Narrow Gauge Lines, Edward A. Downes, ARHS(V), 1963

References

External links

 
 Emerald Tourist Railway Act 1977 (No. 9020)

Heritage railways in Australia
Tourist attractions in Victoria (Australia)
Tourist railways in Victoria (Australia)
2 ft 6 in gauge railways in Australia
1900 establishments in Australia
Transport in the Shire of Yarra Ranges
Transport in the Shire of Cardinia